The Sorrow Gondola is a 1996 poetry collection by the Swedish writer Tomas Tranströmer. The title refers to the composition La lugubre gondola by Franz Liszt. It was the first collection by Tranströmer published after his 1990 stroke. It received the August Prize.

Reception
The book was reviewed in Publishers Weekly, where the critic wrote that while the author's stroke is never mentioned explicitly, the collection "centers unmistakably on the controlled anguish that the 66-year-old poet's physical condition--and encroaching mortality--imposes." The review continued: "What saves the collection from morbidness is the formal beauty and remorselessly compressed clarity of the writing. Indeed, the almost telegraphic brevity of the poems is the volume's only concession to Transtromer's handicap. With the exception of the four-page title poem, a meditation on Wagner's final months, most of the pieces are only a few stanzas long, yet they retain all the force of the poet's earlier work."

See also
 1996 in poetry
 Swedish literature

References

1996 poetry books
Poetry by Tomas Tranströmer
Swedish poetry collections
Albert Bonniers Förlag books
August Prize-winning works